The Onehunga by-election 1953 was a by-election held in the  electorate in Auckland during the term of the 30th New Zealand Parliament, on 19 December 1953. The by-election was won by Hugh Watt of the Labour Party.

Background
The by-election was caused by the death of incumbent MP Arthur Osborne of the Labour Party on 15 November 1953. In early November 1953 Osborne announced that he was not seeking re-election and would retire at the 1954 general election due to ill health. As a result, Labour had already begun preparations to replace him in the electorate at the time of Osborne's death.

Candidates
Labour
There were two nominations for the Labour Party nomination:
Hugh Watt, a local engineering business owner and chairman of the Onehunga Labour Representation Committee

The chairman of the Auckland Labour Representation Committee, Richard French "Dick" Barter, was also speculated as a candidate but he did sot seek the nomination. The Labour Party selected Watt as their candidate at a selection meeting on 30 November.

National
Leonard George Bradley was selected as the National Party candidate. Bradley had contested Onehunga in the previous general election in 1951 against Osborne where he slightly increased National's share of the vote.

Results
The following table gives the election results:

Aftermath

Notes

References

By-elections in New Zealand
1953 elections in New Zealand
Politics of the Auckland Region
December 1953 events in New Zealand
1950s in Auckland